César Argelli (1574–1648) was a Roman Catholic prelate who served as Archbishop of Avignon (1647–1648).

Biography
César Argelli was born in 1574 in Bologna, Italy.
On 6 May 1647, he was appointed during the papacy of Pope Innocent X as Archbishop of Avignon.
On 12 May 1647, he was consecrated bishop by Federico Sforza, Cardinal-Deacon of Santi Vito, Modesto e Crescenzia, with Ranuccio Scotti Douglas, Bishop of Borgo San Donnino, and Alessandro Vittrici, Bishop of Alatri, serving as co-consecrators.
He served as Archbishop of Avignon until his death on 30 Jul 1648.

While bishop, he was the principal co-consecrator of Hyacinthe Serroni, Bishop of Orange (1647).

References

External links and additional sources
 (for Chronology of Bishops) 
 (for Chronology of Bishops)  

17th-century Roman Catholic archbishops in France
Bishops appointed by Pope Innocent X
1574 births
1648 deaths
Archbishops of Avignon